The 2009–10 Scottish Cup was the 125th season of Scotland's most prestigious football knockout competition. The competition was sponsored by the Scottish Government and for sponsorship reasons was known as the Active Nation Scottish Cup.

Calendar

From the First Round to the Third Round, postponed or drawn ties are normally replayed on the following weekend and thereafter on consecutive midweeks. From the Fourth Round to the Sixth Round, postponed or drawn ties are normally replayed on the second midweek after the original date, and thereafter on consecutive midweeks. There are no replays in the semi-finals or the Final.

First round
The draw for the First Round was made at Hamilton Crescent, popularly known as the West of Scotland Cricket Ground, at 15:00 on 3 September 2009. Hamilton Crescent is now the oldest surviving ground to have hosted Scottish Cup Finals, and also hosted the first ever international football match.

This round is populated entirely by non-league clubs:
 13 clubs from the Highland Football League holding membership of the SFA (Inverurie Loco Works, Keith, Wick Academy, Buckie Thistle, Fraserburgh, Huntly, Forres Mechanics, Nairn County, Clachnacuddin, Lossiemouth, Rothes, Brora Rangers, Fort William)
 10 clubs from the East of Scotland League holding membership of the SFA (Edinburgh University, Whitehill Welfare, Preston Athletic, Edinburgh City, Coldstream, Selkirk, Civil Service Strollers, Gala Fairydean, Vale of Leithen, Hawick Royal Albert)
 4 clubs from the South of Scotland League holding membership of the SFA (Dalbeattie Star, Wigtown & Bladnoch, St Cuthbert Wanderers, Newton Stewart)
 4 other clubs holding membership of the SFA (Burntisland Shipyard, Girvan, Glasgow University, Golspie Sutherland)
 4 qualifiers from the Scottish Junior Football Association (Auchinleck Talbot, Banks O' Dee, Bonnyrigg Rose Athletic, Irvine Meadow)

Burntisland Shipyard was the last club drawn and received a bye to the Second Round.

Four of the five Junior clubs (Girvan and the four qualifiers) won their ties, while Bonnyrigg Rose lost after a replay. Hawick Royal Albert's defeat by Huntly led to a police investigation of an allegation that the match had been fixed.

Source: BBC Sport

Replays

Source: BBC Sport

Second round
The 17 winners and 1 bye from the First Round enter here, along with the 10 SFL Third Division clubs, and Cove Rangers (Highland League champions), Deveronvale (Highland League runners-up), Spartans (East of Scotland League champions), and Threave Rovers (South of Scotland League champions). The draw took place on Wednesday 30 September at Scotstoun Leisure Centre.

Source: BBC Sport

Replays

Source: BBC Sport

Third round
The 16 winners from the Second Round enter here, along with the 10 SFL Second Division clubs, and 6 SFL First Division clubs (as the side relegated from the SPL and the clubs which finished 2nd, 3rd and 4th enter in the Fourth Round). The draw took place on Wednesday 28 October.

Source: BBC Sport

Replays

Source: BBC Sport

Fourth round
The 16 winners from the Third Round entered here, along with the 12 SPL clubs and four SFL First Division clubs who were exempt from playing in the Third Round. The draw took place on Monday 30 November at 2:30pm at Hampden Park. The matches were scheduled for 9 January or 10 January 2010, but 10 games were postponed due to the severe weather conditions.

There was controversy as First Division side, Dunfermline Athletic, fielded an ineligible player in their match against Stenhousemuir.  As well as this, the club's management failed to register the two mandatory under-21 players required by the rules and submitted an inaccurate team sheet. As a result of these breaches in the rules, Dunfermline Athletic were to be expelled from the competition and Stenhousemuir were to progress their stead. However following an appeal by the club, a committee decided that expulsion from the competition was too harsh a punishment and wasn't merited by what the club's management described as "honest errors".  The club were given a reprieve along with fines and forfeits of benefits totalling around £30,000. Furthermore, the result of the game was overturned was replayed at Ochilview Park to decide which team progressed in the competition.

Source: BBC Sport

Replays

Source: BBC Sport

Fifth round
The Draw for the Fifth Round was made on Sunday 10 January at approximately 2:15pm at New Douglas Park. It featured the 16 winners of Round 4. The ties were played on 6 & 7 February.

Source: BBC Sport

Replays

Source: BBC Sport

Quarter-finals
The quarter-final draw took place on Wednesday 10 February at 1pm at Hampden Park.

Source: BBC Sport

Replays

Source: BBC Sport

Semi-finals
The semi-final draw took place in Hampden Park on Monday 15 March at 10.30am.

Source: BBC Sport

Final

Source: BBC Sport

Media coverage
From Round 4 onwards, the Scottish Cup was broadcast live in the UK by BBC Scotland & Sky Sports.

References

Scottish Cup seasons
Cup
Scottish Cup